Kamp Glacier is a glacier,  long, flowing northwest between the Austkampane Hills on the west and Nordhaugen Hill, Mehaugen Hill and Sørhaugen Hill on the east, in the Sør Rondane Mountains of Antarctica. It was mapped by Norwegian cartographers in 1957 from air photos taken by U.S. Navy Operation Highjump, 1946–47, and named Kampbreen (the crag glacier).

See also
 List of glaciers in the Antarctic
 Glaciology

References

Glaciers of Queen Maud Land
Princess Ragnhild Coast